Kristofer Montero Strickler (born September 5, 1998) is an American professional soccer player who plays as a forward.

Career

Youth 
Strickler spent four years playing club soccer with local side Blast FC between 2013 and 2017, as well as playing in high school with Saint Charles Preparatory School.

College & Amateur 
In 2017, Strickler began playing college soccer at Virginia Tech. Over four seasons with the Hokies, Strickler made 74 appearances, scoring 28 goals and tallying 10 assists. He also earned honors including; First team All-ACC in 2020, First team VaSID in 2018 and 2020, and  Second team All-ACC in 2018 and 2019.

During the 2019 season, Strickler also appeared in the USL League Two for Dayton Dutch Lions, scoring a goal and tallying a single assist in 5 appearances.

MLS SuperDraft 
On January 21, 2021, Strickler was selected 30th overall in the 2021 MLS SuperDraft by Houston Dynamo. However, he was not signed by the club.

South Georgia Tormenta 
On June 12, 2021, it was announced Strickler had signed for USL League One side South Georgia Tormenta. He made his professional debut the following day, appearing as a 70th-minute substitute during a 1–0 win over Toronto FC II.

International 
In March 2019, Strickler traveled to Bangkok, Thailand to train and attempt to earn a spot in the Philippines national football team. However, to date has not earned a cap for the national team level.

Personal 
Strickler is half-Filipino on his mother's side.

References

External links 
 Kristo Strickler - Men's Soccer Virginia Tech bio
 

1998 births
American people of Filipino descent
American soccer players
Association football forwards
Dayton Dutch Lions players
Houston Dynamo FC draft picks
Living people
Soccer players from Columbus, Ohio
Tormenta FC players
USL League One players
USL League Two players
Virginia Tech Hokies men's soccer players